Maximilian Rupp (born January 6, 1995) is a German footballer who plays for ASV Kleinottweiler.

Career

Rupp joined 1. FC Saarbrücken from 1. FC Kaiserslautern in July 2013, and  debut for the club in a 2–1 3. Liga defeat to Holstein Kiel in December 2013, as a substitute for Maurice Deville.

References

External links

1995 births
Living people
German footballers
1. FC Saarbrücken players
3. Liga players
Association football fullbacks